Peter Ludvig Nicolai Schram (5 September 1819 - 1 July 1895) was a Danish opera singer and actor.

Early life and education
Schram was born on 5 September 1819 in Copenhagen, the son of grocer Lauritz Fussing Schram  (1778–1830) and Marie Sophie Schram née Wexschall (1795–1866). His mother was a sister of the prominent violinist  Friderich Thorkildsen Wexschall. He played four instruments before his confirmation and attended Giuseppe Siboni's music school at the Royal Danish Theatre from 1831. Carl Winsløw taught the 14-year-old boy natural declamation of verse (contrary to N. P. Nielsens's more declamatory style), J. P. E. Hartmann taught him music theory and Siboni worked with his voice before  Henrik Rung and siden Manuel Garcia completed his training.

Schram made his stage debut at the Royal Danish Theatre on 2 April 1834 in a student performance alongside Betty Smidth and Carl Hagen.

Career
Schram had his debut in 1841. He was appointed to Kongelige Kammersangere in 1866.

Death
Schram died in Copenhagen in 1895, aged 75.

References

External links

 Source

19th-century Danish male actors
19th-century Danish male opera singers
Danish bass-baritones
Singers from Copenhagen
1819 births
1895 deaths